Flow is an American residential real-estate company founded by the former CEO of WeWork Adam Neumann and funded by the venture capital firm Andreessen Horowitz. The company hopes to address some aspects of the United States housing shortage through technology, providing equity for renters, and a new type of social interaction. The startup is initially planning to operate 3,000 apartment units, purchased by Neumann, in Nashville, Tennessee; Atlanta, Georgia; and Miami and Fort Lauderdale in Florida.

The company is scheduled to launch in 2023, while the business plan has not yet been made public as of January 2023. According to The New York Times, Flow plans to offer concierge services to renters and management services for Neumann's properties and third-party landlords.

Funding
In mid-August 2022 Flow received a $350 million initial investment from Andreessen Horowitz, valuing the company at over $1 billion and making it a unicorn months before commencing operations. According to The Wall Street Journal, the investment granted Andreessen Horowitz a stake in Flow's real estate portfolio.

Criticism
The decision to invest by Andreessen Horowitz was criticized due to Neumann's previous business issues during his time at WeWork. The New York Times article on the return of the Silicon Valley 'Bro' culture outlined how the Flow deal caused concern among people of color and women who saw Neumann and Flow getting a second chance even though those groups never received the first chance for venture capital.

References

Real estate companies of the United States
Privately held companies of the United States
2023 establishments in the United States